Streptomyces flavidovirens is a bacterium species from the genus of Streptomyces.

See also 
 List of Streptomyces species

References 

flavidovirens
Bacteria described in 1957